Sarah Elizabeth Marston  ( Holloway; February 20, 1893 – March 27, 1993) was an American attorney and psychologist. She is credited, with her husband William Moulton Marston, with the development of the systolic blood pressure measurement used to detect deception; the predecessor to the polygraph.

She is also credited as the inspiration for her husband's comic book creation Wonder Woman, a character fashioned on their polyamorous life partner, Olive Byrne.

Early life
Marston was born Sarah Elizabeth Holloway on the Isle of Man, to William George Washington Holloway (died February 13, 1961), an American bank clerk, and his English wife, Daisy ( De Gaunza; died July 19, 1945), who had married in England in 1892. After her family moved to the United States, Sarah was raised in Boston, Massachusetts. Her nickname was "Sadie". She eventually discarded her forename in favor of her middle name, Elizabeth, by which she would become known.

Career and family
Marston received her BA in psychology from Mount Holyoke College in 1915  and her LLB from the Boston University School of Law in 1918, one of just three female graduates of the School of Law that year.

Marston married William Moulton Marston in 1915. She first gave birth at age 35, then returned to work. During her long and productive career, she indexed the documents of the first fourteen Congresses, lectured on law, ethics and psychology at several American universities, and served as an editor for Encyclopædia Britannica and McCall's. She cowrote a textbook, Integrative Psychology, with her husband and C. Daly King. In 1933, she became the assistant to the chief executive at Metropolitan Life Insurance.

Sometime in the late 1920s, Olive Byrne, a young woman William had met while teaching at Tufts University, joined the household. Elizabeth Marston had two children, Peter and Olive Ann, while Olive Byrne also gave birth to two of William's children, Byrne and Donn. The Marstons legally adopted Olive's boys, and Olive remained a part of the family, even after William's death in 1947.

Olive stayed home with the children while Marston worked. Continuing at MetLife until she was sixty-five, Elizabeth sponsored all four children through college — and Byrne through medical school and Donn through law school as well. She and Olive continued living together until Olive's death in 1990. Both Olive and Marston "embodied the feminism of the day."

Systolic blood-pressure test
Marston enrolled in the master's degree program at Radcliffe College of Harvard University while her husband William attended the doctoral program in psychology at Harvard, which at that time enrolled only male students. She worked with William on his thesis, which concerned the correlation between blood pressure levels and deception. He later developed this into the systolic blood-pressure test used to detect deception that was the predecessor to the polygraph test.

In 1921, Marston received her MA from Radcliffe and William received his PhD from Harvard. Although Marston is not listed as William's collaborator in his early work, a number of writers refer directly and indirectly to Elizabeth's work on her husband's blood pressure/deception research. She appears in a picture taken in his polygraph laboratory in the 1920s, reproduced in a 1938 publication by William.

Wonder Woman
A 1992 "Our Towns" feature of The New York Times discussed Marston's involvement in the creation of Wonder Woman (although no source is cited in the article for the declaration “this super-hero had better be a woman” that was attributed to Holloway): 

Her 1993 obituary also stated that she contributed to the development of Wonder Woman, while Lillian S. Robinson argued that both Olive Byrne and Elizabeth were models for the character.

Death
Marston died on March 27, 1993, one month after her 100th birthday.

In film
Marston's life is depicted in Professor Marston and the Wonder Women, a 2017 fictional biographical drama that also portrays her husband William, Olive Byrne, and the creation of Wonder Woman. Marston is portrayed in the film by British actress Rebecca Hall.

Asteroid
Asteroid 101813 Elizabethmarston was named in her memory. The official naming citation was published by the Minor Planet Center on September 25, 2018 along with the naming of Asteroid 102234 Olivebyrne.

Works
 Integrative Psychology: A Study of Unit Response by William Moulton Marston, C. Daly King, and Elizabeth Holloway Marston, 1931.
 "Chalk Marks on the Gate", by Elizabeth Holloway; illus. Adolf Treidler; Woman's Home Companion, 1924, January; pp 14–15, 96.
 "Gift-Horse", by Elizabeth Holloway; illus. George Wright; Woman's Home Companion, 1922, July; pp 22–23, 92–93.

References

External links 
 "My Grandmother Was the Real-Life Wonder Woman (Guest Column)," The Hollywood Reporter, June 2, 2017.

20th-century American psychologists
American women psychologists
Feminist psychologists
20th-century American women writers
Female comics writers
Golden Age comics creators
American centenarians
American feminists
Women inventors
Lecturers
Manx centenarians
Boston University School of Law alumni
Mount Holyoke College alumni
Radcliffe College alumni
Manx emigrants to the United States
Writers from Boston
Wonder Woman
1893 births
1993 deaths
LGBT people from Connecticut
Bisexual women
Bisexual scientists
LGBT psychologists
American people of English descent
Women centenarians
American LGBT scientists
American LGBT writers
Writers from Connecticut
Polyamorous people